Waseem Abbas is a Pakistani television, film actor and director. He is known for his roles in television dramas for PTV and other networks, including Samundar, Raat, Ashiyana, Family Front, Landa Bazar, and Din.

Career 
Waseem Abbas is the son of singer and actor Inayat Hussain Bhatti. His uncle Kaifee (real name Kifayat Hussain Bhatti) was also an actor and director. He started his career as a TV actor in Lahore.

Filmography

Films
 Haidar Daler (1978) 
 Manzil (1981)
 Aina Aur Zindagi (1982)
 Zara Si Baat (1982)
 Tina (1983)
 Badaltay Rishtay (1983)
 Naseebon Wali (1984)
 Shah Behram (1985) Punjabi film
 Haq Mehr (1985)
 First Blood 1986
 Jugnu 1987
 Jut Majhe Da (1988)
 Taqatwar (1989)
 Ishq Rog (1989)
 Sarmaya 1990
 Action 1991
 Mera Intaqam 1992
 Punjab Nahin Jaun Gi (2017)

TV drama serials

Awards and recognition

References

External links 
 Waseem Abbas filmography at IMDb 

1960 births
Pakistani television directors
Living people
Male actors from Lahore
Punjabi people
Pakistani male stage actors
Pakistani male comedians
20th-century Pakistani male actors
Pakistani male television actors
Pakistani male film actors
Recipients of the Pride of Performance
Male actors in Urdu cinema